Jean Louis Francois Philipsen Prahm (15 September 1912 – 4 December 2003) was a Danish field hockey player who competed in the 1936 Summer Olympics. Born in the Dutch East Indies.

He was the younger brother of Peter Prahm.

In 1936 he was a member of the Danish team which was eliminated in the group stage of the Olympic tournament. He played both matches as forward.

External links
 
profile

1912 births
2003 deaths
Danish male field hockey players
Olympic field hockey players of Denmark
Field hockey players at the 1936 Summer Olympics